Ferruccio Valcareggi (12 February 1919 – 2 November 2005) was an Italian football player and coach, who played as a midfielder.

Playing career
Valcareggi was born in Trieste, on 12 February 1919. A right–sided, offensive–minded, central midfielder – known as a mezzala in Italian football jargon –, he had a successful playing career, playing for nine different teams, including clubs such as Fiorentina, A.C. Milan, Bologna, and his home-town club Triestina, with whom he began his career in 1937, ending his playing career in 1954 with Piombino. He won the Coppa Alta Italia with Bologna in 1946. He scored 73 goals in 403 matches, 59 of which came in Serie A, in 270 appearances. He was never capped at international level, however.

Managerial career
Valcareggi is widely remembered for his success as a coach, in particular with Italy national football team. He began his coaching career as a player–manager with Piombino in 1952; after managing several Italian club sides (including Prato, helping the club to the 1956–57 Serie C title and Serie B promotion, as well as Atalanta and Fiorentina), he was named the Italian team's coach, replacing manager Edmondo Fabbri – under whom he served as an assistant – initially alongside Helenio Herrera, and later independently. He was in charge of the Italian national side between 1966 and 1974, guiding them to victory in the 1968 European Championship on home soil, and to the final in the 1970 FIFA World Cup in Mexico. Under Valcareggi, Italy lost only six games in eight years.

Despite his success with the national side, Valcareggi is also remembered for devising the infamous "staffetta" (relay) match strategy during the 1970 World Cup. Due to his focus on defensive stability, as well as the presence of two pure, prolific goalscoring strikers, Riva and Boninsegna, Valcareggi felt that it would not be possible to field Italy's two most revered advanced playmakers at the time, Gianni Rivera, and Sandro Mazzola, alongside each other. He believed the two creative players to be incompatible with each other, due to the rivalry between their respective clubs, and as he felt that deploying both players alongside the forwards would offset the balance within the starting line-up, in particular as Rivera, unlike Mazzola, was not renowned for his athleticism or defensive work-rate. When Mazzola had come down with a stomach flu, which affected his fitness, he therefore conceived the plan, which essentially consisted of Mazzola playing the first half of each match, whilst Rivera would play the second half when the opponents would begin to tire and offer him more space. Despite Italy's victory at the 1968 European Championship and their second-place finish at the 1970 World Cup, the tactic was widely criticised by the media, in particular due to Italy's negative performance during the group-stage and in the final defeat to Brazil, despite demonstrating their ability to successfully apply a more offensive, exciting style of play with Rivera in the semi-final against West Germany. The two players only played together briefly in the final, when Rivera came on for Boninsegna for the last six minutes of the match.

Valcareggi also helped Italy to qualify for the 1974 FIFA World Cup; although they were considered among the favourites to win the title, they were knocked out in the first round of the tournament, which led to Valcareggi stepping down from his position as Italy's head coach; during the tournament, he had an infamous falling out with Giorgio Chinaglia, who insulted Valcareggi upon being substituted. Following his international career, Valcareggi worked as a club coach in Italy with Hellas Verona and Roma, as well as the Italian youth B Team; he also briefly served as a pundit. He later also worked for Fiorentina's technical sector; he was inducted into the Fiorentina Hall of Fame in 2013.

Style of management
With the Italian national team, Valcareggi's rigid tactics were largely inspired by the Italian catenaccio system that had been popularised by Inter manager Herrera during the 1960s, as demonstrated by his use of a sweeper behind two man–marking central defenders and a full-back, and his use of a strategy based on heavy defending and stability. Italy were known for their ability to grind out results successfully under his tenure, and defend narrow leads after scoring, due their ability to concede few goals, which led to criticism in the Italian media over the team's lack of goals and dull gameplay, but also proved to be an effective strategy. Despite the team's more defensive playing style, they also demonstrated their offensive capabilities under Valcareggi during the 1970 World Cup; due to the altitude, his team favoured a slower gameplay, avoiding excessive sprints, which highlighted the technical ability of his players. Valcareggi was also known for this infamous staffetta policy, which involved him using his two star, talented, and skilful playmakers – Mazzola and Rivera – for one half each during matches, so as not to offset the balance within the team. The more athletic, dynamic, and direct Mazzola would start matches, while the more creative but less mobile and hard-working Rivera would come on when the opponents would begin to tire, which would allow him to dictate the game in midfield with his passing. His team adopted a more attractive playing style leading up to the 1974 World Cup, but struggled in the final tournament, and suffered a disappointing first–round elimination, which Valcareggi attributed to a lack of a united team in the dressing room, and his own inability to manage the group of players he was coaching at the time effectively. In addition to his tactical intelligence and coaching ability, he was known for his ability to instill a sense of calm in his team, and for developing a close relationship with his players, despite his reserved character; he was also known for his fair-play approach and honesty, as well as his elegant attire.

Personal life
In September 1943, Valcareggi married Anna Peruzzi, with whom he had three children.

Death
Valcareggi died in Florence on 2 November 2005, at the age of 86.

Honours

Player
Bologna
Coppa Alta Italia: 1945–46

Coach
Prato
Serie C: 1956–57

Italy
UEFA European Championship: 1968
FIFA World Cup runner-up: 1970

Individual
Seminatore d'oro: 1956–57, 1972–73
Italian Football Hall of Fame: 2011
Fiorentina Hall of Fame

References

External links
UEFA news of Valcareggi's death
Italian Football Federation page of Valcareggi 

1919 births
2005 deaths
Footballers from Trieste
Italian footballers
Italian football managers
Italy national football team managers
L.R. Vicenza players
Bologna F.C. 1909 players
ACF Fiorentina players
A.C. Milan players
U.S. Triestina Calcio 1918 players
Brescia Calcio players
S.S.D. Lucchese 1905 players
Serie A players
Serie B players
UEFA Euro 1968 managers
1970 FIFA World Cup managers
1974 FIFA World Cup managers
UEFA European Championship-winning managers
Hellas Verona F.C. managers
A.S. Roma managers
Atalanta B.C. managers
Serie A managers
Association football midfielders